Tarquinia Tarquini (1882 - 25 February 1976) was an Italian dramatic soprano and the wife of composer Riccardo Zandonai.

Biography
Born in Colle di Val d'Elsa, Tarquini studied singing at the Milan Conservatory and privately in Florence. She made her stage debut in 1905 and spent the next two years performing in opera houses throughout Italy.

In 1907 Tarquini was brought to the United States by impresario Henry Russell to join his Boston-based San Carlo Opera Company. She made her debut with the company in Boston as Santuzza in Cavalleria rusticana and then embarked on a North American tour with the company. That same year she also performed the title role in the United States premiere of Adriana Lecouvreur at the French Opera House in New Orleans.

Between 1908-1911 Tarquini performed in operas in Austria, Egypt, Italy, and Portugal. Among the roles she sang were Cio-Cio San in Madama Butterfly, Maddalena de Coigny in Andrea Chénier, Mimì in La bohème, and the title role in Manon. She drew particular acclaim for her portrayal of the title role in Richard Strauss's Salome and, being a good dancer, was notably one of the first opera singers to perform the Dance of the Seven Veils herself; a move which shocked some conservative critics.

On 14 October 1911 Tarquini portrayed the title role in the world premiere of Zandonai's Conchita at the Teatro Dal Verme in Milan. Her performance was a triumphant success and she went on to perform the role several more times, including at the Royal Opera, London (1912), the Cort Theatre in San Francisco (1912), the Philharmonic Auditorium in Hollywood (1912), the Heilig Theatre in Portland, Oregon (1912), the Metropolitan Opera House in Philadelphia (1912), the Auditorium Theatre in Chicago (1913), the Metropolitan Opera in New York City (1913), and the Teatro di San Carlo in Naples (1913).

Tarquini remained busy as a performer up until her retirement from the stage in 1917 following her marriage that year to Zandonai. She had an important success at Covent Garden as Bizet's Carmen in 1912 and, besides Conchita, Salome was her most frequently assailed role. After her marriage, she lived most of her remaining life with her husband in Milan. She died in that city at the age of 93. Tarquini's voice was never recorded.

References

Waterhouse, John CG (1992), 'Zandonai, Riccardo' in The New Grove Dictionary of Opera, ed. Stanley Sadie (London)

Further reading
 Dryden, Konrad (1999) Riccardo Zandonai, A Biography, Peter Lang (Frankfurt) 

1882 births
1976 deaths
People from Colle di Val d'Elsa
Italian operatic sopranos
20th-century Italian women opera singers
Milan Conservatory alumni